The Blackwater River is located in the Buller District of New Zealand.

References

Buller District
Rivers of the West Coast, New Zealand
Rivers of New Zealand